The 2010 New York Mets season was the franchise's 49th season and their second at Citi Field. The team was attempting to rebound from the injury plagued 2009 season as they sought their first postseason appearance since 2006. However, they failed in their goal, earning a 79-83 record and second consecutive fourth-place finish in the NL East, leading to the firing of manager Jerry Manuel and the dismissal of general manager Omar Minaya at the conclusion of the season.

Offseason
On November 6, 2009, the Mets declined to exercise relief pitcher J. J. Putz's 2010 team option, who subsequently signed with the Chicago White Sox. Catcher Brian Schneider and shortstop Wilson Valdez signed contracts to the Philadelphia Phillies. Nelson Figueroa would also later join the Phillies on Opening Day upon being acquired off waivers from the Mets. On November 30, 2009, the Mets re-signed Alex Cora to an identical one year $2 million deal. They also signed former San Diego Padre catcher Henry Blanco and former Astro Chris Coste. In December 2009, the Mets signed pitchers Ryota Igarashi and Kelvim Escobar.

On December 29, the Mets signed outfielder Jason Bay to a four-year $65 million deal. On January 5, 2010, the Mets signed R. A. Dickey to a minor league contract. On January 13, 2010, Carlos Beltrán underwent knee surgery, and did not return until after the All-Star break. On January 22, 2010, The Mets acquired outfielder Gary Matthews, Jr. along with 21 million of the 23.5 million he was due of the last two years of his contract from the Los Angeles Angels of Anaheim in exchange for relief pitcher Brian Stokes.

The Mets signed right-handed pitcher Josh Fogg to a minor league deal on January 29, 2010, extending him an invitation to Spring training. The Mets also re-signed former member Mike Jacobs to a minor league deal and invited him to Spring training. The Mets also continued this offseason's trend of signing catchers by finalizing a deal with catcher Rod Barajas. The Mets later invited Raúl Valdés to spring training during March. He'd eventually make it on the roster in early April after Sean Green was placed on the disabled list.

On March 11, 2010, the Mets announced that starting shortstop José Reyes would miss 2–8 weeks after being diagnosed with a hyperthyroid problem, but on March 24, the Mets announced that he would return for camp that same day and would be ready for the first weekend series vs the Washington Nationals.

Regular season

April

The Mets opened their season at home with a 7–1 victory over the Florida Marlins. After a shaky 4–8 start and questions surrounding the lineup, they called up highly touted prospect Ike Davis. The call-up and the surprising emergence of starting pitcher Mike Pelfrey who ended the month 4–0, with a NL leading 0.69 ERA along with the rest of the pitching staff, resulted in positive momentum for the Mets. They went 9–1 on a ten-game homestand, having done that twice in their history. They finished the homestand with an overall record of 13–9 and leading the NL East by a ½ game over the Phillies. The Mets wrapped up the month with a 9–1 win over the Phillies, giving them a 14–9 record and a 1½ game lead in the East.

May
The Mets followed their successful April by slumping to a 12–17 finish in May. However, after starting the month 6–14, the team's fortunes appeared to turn around beginning with a 5–3 victory over their crosstown rivals, the New York Yankees, on May 22. The Mets went on to win their three-game series against the Yankees, and followed it up with a three-game sweep of their NL East rivals, the first place Philadelphia Phillies. The series, in which the Mets shut the Phillies out in all three games, marked the first time the Mets had shut out a team three days in a row since 1969—when the Mets shut out the Phillies three games in a row in September. It was also only the third time since 1876 that a first place team was shut out in all games of a sweep. The Mets finished 12–17 in May and an even 26–26 overall, having gone 6–4 from May 20 onward.

June
The Mets had a strong June, continuing their winning ways at Citi Field with a nine-game home winning streak extending from May. The team finally won a series on the road, compiling a 7–2 record from June 11 to the 20th, sweeping the Baltimore Orioles and Cleveland Indians before losing two of three against the Yankees in Yankee Stadium. The Mets' resurgence was due in part to R. A. Dickey, Hisanori Takahashi and Jon Niese bolstering the starting rotation as well as José Reyes and David Wright emerging from their early season struggles to lead the team's offense. The Mets finished June 18–8, 1½ games behind the Atlanta Braves for the NL East lead and holding the NL Wild Card lead.

July and August
The Mets went into July in second place behind the Atlanta Braves. In the final series before the All-Star break, which began with the Mets just three games out of first, the Mets lost two of three to the Braves, dropping them to four games back. They never recovered, struggling for the rest of July, culminating with a 2-9 West Coast road trip, including a sweep at the hands of the last-place Arizona Diamondbacks. Their season spiraled downward further when in August, Francisco Rodriguez beat up his father-in-law in front of the other players' family. In the process, Rodriguez tore a ligament in his hand and, needing surgery, his season was ended. As a result, the Mets began the process of trying to void his contract, and placed him on the disqualified list, not paying him for the remainder of the season.  In July Jason Bay suffered a concussion that he would never return from. Jeff Francoeur was traded to the Texas Rangers as August came to an end.

September and October
The season ended when Óliver Pérez earned his fifth loss of the season by hitting a batter then issuing three straight walks in the 14th inning against the Washington Nationals. The Mets lost the game 2-1.

Game log

|- style="background-color:#cfc"
| 1 || April 5 || Marlins|| 7–1 || Santana (1–0) || Johnson (0–1) || — || 41,245 || 1–0 || Box
|- style="background-color:#fbb"
| 2 || April 7 || Marlins|| 6–7  || Núñez (1–0) || Takahashi (0–1) || Wood (1) || 38,863 || 1–1 || Box
|- style="background-color:#fbb"
| 3 || April 8 || Marlins|| 1–3 || Robertson (1–0) || Niese (0–1) || Núñez (1) || 25,982 ||1–2 || Box
|- style="background-color:#cfc"
| 4 || April 9 || Nationals || 8–2 || Pelfrey (1–0) || Batista (0–1) || — || 28,055 || 2–2 || Box
|- style="background-color:#fbb"
| 5 || April 10 || Nationals || 3–4 || Lannan (1–1) || Pérez (0–1) || Capps (2) || 33,044 || 2–3 || Box
|- style="background-color:#fbb"
| 6 || April 11 || Nationals || 2–5 || Hernández (1–0) || Santana (1–1) || Capps (3) || 33,672 || 2–4 || Box
|- style="background-color:#fbb"
| 7 || April 13 || @ Rockies || 3–11 || Smith (1–1)|| Maine (0–1) || — || 25,110 || 2–5 || Box
|- style="background-color:#fbb"
| 8 || April 14 || @ Rockies || 5–6  || Flores (1–0) || Mejía (0–1) || — || 26,310 || 2–6 || Box
|- style="background-color:#cfc"
| 9 || April 15 || @ Rockies  || 5–0 || Pelfrey (2–0) || de la Rosa (1–1) || — || 26,195 || 3–6 || Box
|- style="background-color:#fbb"
| 10 || April 16 || @ Cardinals || 3–4 || Carpenter (2–0) || Nieve (0–1) || Franklin (4) || 40,101 || 3–7 || Box
|- style="background-color:#cfc"
| 11 || April 17 || @ Cardinals || 2–1  || Rodríguez (1–0)  || Mather (0–1) || Pelfrey (1) || 43,709 || 4–7 || Box
|- style="background-color:#fbb"
| 12 || April 18 || @ Cardinals || 3–5 || Wainwright (3–0) || Stoner (0–1) || — || 40,007 || 4–8 || Box
|- style="background-color:#cfc"
| 13 || April 19 || Cubs || 6–1 || Nieve (1–1) || Russell (0–1) || — || 27,940 || 5–8 || Box
|- style="background-color:#cfc"
| 14 || April 20 || Cubs || 4–0 || Pelfrey (3–0) || Zambrano (1–2) || — || 27,502 || 6–8 || Box
|- style="background-color:#fbb"
| 15 || April 21 || Cubs || 3–9 || Silva (2–0) || Pérez (0–2) || — || 25,684 || 6–9 || Box
|- style="background-color:#cfc"
| 16 || April 22 || Cubs || 5–2 || Santana (2–1) || Gorzelanny (0–2) || Rodríguez (1)|| 28,535 || 7–9 || Box
|- style="background-color:#cfc"
| 17 || April 23 || Braves || 5–2 || Takahashi (1–1) || Kawakami (0–3) || Rodríguez (2) || 32,265 || 8–9 || Box
|- style="background-color:#cfc"
| 18 || April 24 || Braves || 3–1 || Acosta (1–0) || Jurrjens (0–2) || Rodríguez (3) || 36,547 || 9–9 || Box
|- style="background-color:#cfc"
| 19 || April 25 || Braves || 1–0  || Pelfrey (4–0) || Hanson (1–2) || — || 27,623 || 10–9 || Box
|- style="background-color:#bbb"
| — || April 26 || Dodgers || colspan=7 |Game Postponed
|- style="background-color:#cfc"
| 20 || April 27 || Dodgers || 4–0 || Santana (3–1) || Kuroda (2–1) || — || || 11–9 || Box
|- style="background-color:#cfc"
| 21 || April 27 || Dodgers || 10–5 || Takahashi (2–1) || Haeger (0–3) || — || 32,012 || 12–9 || Box
|- style="background-color:#cfc"
| 22 || April 28 || Dodgers || 7–3 || Maine (1–1) || Ely (0–1) || — || 29,724 || 13-9 || Box
|- style="background-color:#cfc"
| 23 || April 30 || @ Phillies || 9–1 || Niese (1–1) || Kendrick (0–1) || — || 45,296 || 14–9 || Box

|- style="background-color:#fbb"
| 24 || May 1 || @ Phillies || 0–10 || Halladay (5–1) || Pelfrey (4–1) || — || 45,264 ||  14–10 || Box
|- style="background-color:#fbb"
| 25 || May 2 || @ Phillies || 5–11 || Moyer (3–2) || Santana (3–2) || — || 45,439 || 14–11  || Box
|- style="background-color:#fbb"
| 26 || May 3 || @ Reds || 2–3  || Masset (3–1)||Acosta (1–1) || — || 14,350 || 14–12  || Box
|- style="background-color:#cfc"
| 27 || May 4 || @ Reds || 5–4 || Feliciano (1–0) || Cordero (1–2) || Rodríguez (4) || 13,813 || 15–12 || Box
|- style="background-color:#fbb"
| 28 || May 5 || @ Reds || 4–5 || Owings (3–0) || Feliciano (1–1) || — || 16,798 || 15–13 || Box
|- style="background-color:#cfc"
| 29 || May 7 || Giants || 6–4 || Rodríguez (2–0) || Romo (0–3)|| — || 34,681 || 16–13 || Box
|- style="background-color:#cfc"
| 30 || May 8 || Giants || 5–4 || Takahashi (3–1) || Mota (0–1) || — || 36,764 || 17–13 || Box
|- style="background-color:#fbb"
| 31 || May 9 || Giants || 5–6 || Romo (1–3) || Mejía (0–2) || Wilson (7) || 35,641 || 17–14 || Box
|- style="background-color:#fbb"
| 32 || May 10 || Nationals || 2– 3|| Atilano (3-0)|| Maine (1–2) || Batista (1) || 29,313 || 17–15 || Box
|- style="background-color:#cfc"
| 33 || May 11 || Nationals || 8–6 || Valdés (1–0) || Clippard (6–1) || Rodríguez (5) || 31,606 || 18–15 || Box
|- style="background-color:#fbb"
| 34 || May 12 || Nationals || 4–6 || Clippard (7–1) || Rodríguez (2–1) || Capps (14) || 33,024 || 18–16 || Box
|- style="background-color:#fbb"
| 35 || May 13 || @ Marlins || 1–2 || Núñez (2–0) || Nieve (1–2) || — || 16,229 || 18–17  || Box
|- style="background-color:#fbb"
| 36 || May 14 || @ Marlins || 2–7 || Sánchez (2–2)  || Pérez (0–3)  || — || 21,221 || 18–18  || Box
|- style="text-align:center;background-color:#ffbbbb"
| 37 || May 15 || @ Marlins || 5–7 || Robertson (4–3) || Maine (1–3) || Núñez (8) || 26,007 || 18–19  || Box
|- style="background-color:#fbb"
| 38 || May 16 || @ Marlins || 8–10 || Nolasco (4–2) || Niese (1–2) || Núñez (9) || 17,977 || 18–20 || Box
|- style="background-color:#cfc"
| 39 || May 17 || @ Braves || 3–2 || Pelfrey (5–1) || Lowe (5–4) || Rodríguez (6) || 21,086 || 19–20 || Box
|- style="background-color:#fbb"
| 40 || May 18 || @ Braves || 2–3 || Wagner (3–0) || Feliciano (1–2) || — || 27,119 || 19–21 || Box
|- style="background-color:#fbb"
| 41 || May 19 || @ Nationals || 3–5 || Storen (1–0) || Valdés(1–1) || Capps (15) || 19,384 || 19–22 || Box
|- style="background-color:#cfc"
| 42 || May 20 || @ Nationals || 10–7 || Valdés (2–1) || Atilano (3–1) || — || 23,612 || 20–22 || Box
|- style="background-color:#fbb"
| 43 || May 21 || Yankees || 1–2 || Vázquez (3–4) || Dessens (0–1) || Rivera (8) || 41,382 || 20–23 || Box
|- style="background-color:#cfc"
| 44 || May 22 || Yankees || 5–3 || Pelfrey (6–1) || Hughes (5–1) || Rodríguez (7) || 41,343 || 21–23 || Box
|- style="background-color:#cfc"
| 45 || May 23 || Yankees || 6–4 || Santana (4–2)|| Sabathia (4–3) || Rodríguez (8) || 41,422 || 22–23 || Box
|- style="background-color:#cfc"
| 46 || May 25 || Phillies || 8–0 || Dickey (1–0) || Moyer (5–4) || Valdés (1) || 33,026 || 23–23 || Box
|- style="background-color:#cfc"
| 47 || May 26 || Phillies || 5–0 || Takahashi (4–1) || Blanton (1–3) || — || 33,223 || 24–23 || Box
|- style="background-color:#cfc"
| 48 || May 27 || Phillies  || 3–0 || Pelfrey (7–1) || Hamels (5–3) || Rodríguez (9) || 35,903 || 25–23 || Box
|- style="background-color:#fbb"
| 49 || May 28 || @ Brewers || 0–2 || Gallardo (5–2) || Igarashi (0–1) || — || 32,773 || 25–24 || Box
|- style="background-color:#fbb"
| 50 || May 29 || @ Brewers || 6–8 || Coffey (2–1) || Nieve (1–3) || Axford (2) || 37,841 || 25–25 || Box
|- style="background-color:#cfc"
| 51 || May 30 || @ Brewers || 10–4 || Dickey (2–0) || Suppan (0–2) || — || 36,559 || 26–25 || Box
|- style="background-color:#fbb"
| 52 || May 31 || @ Padres || 6–18 || Correia (5-4) || Takahashi (4–2) || — || 20,023 || 26–26 || Box

|- style="text-align:center;background-color:#bbffbb"
| 53 || June 1 || @ Padres || 4–2 || Pelfrey (8-1) || LeBlanc (2-4) || Rodríguez (10) || 17,393 || 27–26 || Box
|- style="background-color:#fbb"
| 54 || June 2 || @ Padres ||1–5  || Webb (2–1) || Valdés (2–2) || — || 15,880 || 27–27 || Box
|- style="background-color:#cfc"
| 55 || June 4 || Marlins || 4–3 || Dickey (3–0)|| Sánchez (5–3)|| Rodríguez (11) || 30,042 || 28–27 || Box
|- style="background-color:#cfc"
| 56 || June 5 || Marlins || 6–1 || Niese (2–2) || Robertson (4–5) || — || 37,165 || 29–27 || Box
|- style="background-color:#cfc"
| 57 || June 6 || Marlins || 7–6 || Feliciano (2–2) || Hensley (1–2) || Rodríguez (12) || 36,612 || 30–27 || Box
|- style="background-color:#cfc"
| 58 || June 8 || Padres || 2–1  || Dessens (1–1) || Mujica (2–1) || — || 30,086 || 31–27 || Box
|- style="background-color:#bbb"
| — || June 9 || Padres || colspan=7 |Game Postponed
|- style="background-color:#fbb"
| 59 || June 10 || Padres || 2–4 || Latos (6–4) || Santana (4–3) || Bell (17) || 32,365 || 31–28 || Box
|- style="background-color:#cfc"
| 60 || June 10 || Padres || 3–0 || Niese (3–2) || Garland (6–4) || — || 28,072 || 32–28 || Box
|- style="background-color:#cfc"
| 61 || June 11 || @ Orioles || 5–1 || Dickey (4–0) || Guthrie (3–7) || — || 28,554 || 33–28 || Box
|- style="background-color:#cfc"
| 62 || June 12 || @ Orioles || 3–1 || Takahashi (5–2) || Matusz (2–7) || Rodríguez (13) || 42,248 || 34–28 || Box
|- style="background-color:#cfc"
| 63 || June 13 || @ Orioles || 11–4 || Pelfrey (9–1) || Millwood (0–8) || — || 24,848 || 35–28 || Box
|- style="background-color:#cfc"
| 64 || June 15 || @ Indians || 7–6 || Santana (5–3) || Masterson (2–6) || Rodríguez (14) || 12,882 || 36–28 || Box
|- style="background-color:#cfc"
| 65 || June 16 || @ Indians || 8–4 || Niese (4–2) || Talbot (7–5) || — || 14,246 || 37–28 || Box
|- style="background-color:#cfc"
| 66 || June 17 || @ Indians || 6–4 ||  Dickey (5–0) || Westbrook (4–4) || Rodríguez (15) || 14,339 || 38–28 || Box
|- style="background-color:#cfc"
| 67 || June 18 || @ Yankees || 4–0 || Takahashi (6–2) || Vázquez (6–6) || Rodríguez (16) || 49,220 || 39–28 || Box
|- style="background-color:#fbb"
| 68 || June 19 || @ Yankees || 3–5 || Hughes (10–1) || Pelfrey (9–2) || Rivera (16) || 49,073 || 39–29 || Box
|- style="background-color:#fbb"
| 69 || June 20 || @ Yankees || 0–4 || Sabathia (8–3) || Santana (5–4) || — || 49,240 || 39–30 || Box
|- style="background-color:#cfc"
| 70 || June 22 || Tigers || 14–6 || Nieve (2–3) || Verlander (8–5) || — || 32,363 || 40–30 || Box
|- style="background-color:#cfc"
| 71 || June 23 || Tigers ||5–0 ||Dickey (6–0) ||Bonderman (3–5)|| — || 35,045 ||41–30||Box
|- style="background-color:#fbb"
| 72 || June 24 || Tigers || 5–6 || Galarraga (3-1) || Takahashi (6–3) || Valverde (17) || 31,319  || 41–31 || Box
|- style="background-color:#cfc"
| 73 || June 25 || Twins || 5–2 || Pelfrey (10–2) || Slowey (7–5) || Rodríguez (17) || 36,244 || 42–31 || Box
|- style="background-color:#fbb"
| 74 || June 26 || Twins || 0–6 || Pavano (9–6)|| Santana (5–5) || — || 37,510 || 42–32 || Box
|- style="background-color:#cfc"
| 75 || June 27 || Twins || 6–0 || Niese (5–2) || Baker (6–7) || — || 37,644 || 43–32 ||Box
|- style="background-color:#fbb"
| 76 || June 28 || @ Marlins^ || 3–10 || Nolasco (7–6) || Dickey (6–1) || — || 18,073 || 43–33 || Box
|- style="background-color:#fbb"
| 77 || June 29 || @ Marlins^ || 6–7 || Núñez (3–1) || Feliciano (2–3) || — || 18,373 || 43–34 || Box
|- style="background-color:#cfc"
| 78 || June 30 || @ Marlins^ || 6–5 ||Dessens (2–1)  || Sanabia (0–1)|| Rodríguez (18) ||19,232 ||44–34 ||Box
|-
| colspan=8 | ^ - Played in San Juan, Puerto Rico

|- style="background-color:#fbb"
| 79 || July 1 || @ Nationals || 1–2 || Capps (1–3) || Feliciano  (2–4) || — || 20,167 || 44–35 || Box
|- style="background-color:#cfc"
| 80 || July 2 || @ Nationals || 5–3 || Niese (6–2) || Atiano (6–5) || Rodríguez (19) || 24,410 || 45–35 || Box
|- style="background-color:#fbb"
| 81 || July 3 || @ Nationals || 5–6 || Capps (2–3) || Rodríguez (2–2) || — || 39,214 || 45–36 || Box
|- style="background-color:#cfc"
| 82 || July 4 || @ Nationals || 9–5 || Takahashi (7–3) || Stammen (2–3) || Rodríguez (20) || 29,234 || 46–36 || Box
|- style="background-color:#fbb"
| 83 || July 5 || Reds || 6–8 || Smith (2–1) || Pelfrey (10–3)|| Cordero (23) || 36,764 || 46–37 || Box
|- style="background-color:#cfc"
| 84 || July 6 || Reds || 3–0 || Santana (6–5) || Maloney (0–1) || — ||  27,473 || 47–37 || Box
|- style="background-color:#fbb"
| 85 || July 7 || Reds || 1–3 || Arroyo (9–4) || Niese (6–3) || Cordero (24) || 30,029 || 47–38 || Box
|- style="background-color:#fbb"
| 86 || July 9 || Braves || 2–4 || O'Flaherty (3–1) || Dickey (6–2)|| Wagner (20) || 36,356 || 47–39 || Box
|- style="background-color:#fbb"
| 87 || July 10 || Braves || 0–4 || Hudson (9–4) || Pelfrey (10–4) || — || 37,793 || 47–40 || Box
|- style="background-color:#cfc"
| 88 || July 11 || Braves || 3–0 || Santana (7–5) || Lowe (9–8)|| Rodríguez (21) || 36,402 || 48–40 || Box
|- style="background-color:#fbb"
| 89 || July 15 || @ Giants || 0–2 || Lincecum (10–4) || Dickey (6–3) || — || 38,416 || 48–41 || Box
|- style="background-color:#fbb"
| 90 || July 16 || @ Giants || 0–1 || Zito (8–4) || Niese (6–4) || Wilson (24) || 41,869 || 48–42 || Box
|- style="background-color:#fbb"
| 91 || July 17 || @ Giants || 4–8 || Cain (7–8) || Takahashi (7–4) || Wilson (25) || 42,599 || 48–43 || Box
|- style="background-color:#cfc"
| 92 || July 18 || @ Giants || 4–3  || Rodríguez (3–2) || Wilson (2–1) || — || 37,623 || 49–43 || Box
|- style="background-color:#fbb"
| 93 || July 19 || @ Diamondbacks || 2–13 || Kennedy (5–7) || Pelfrey (10–5 )|| — || 18,253 || 49–44 || Box
|- style="background-color:#fbb"
| 94 || July 20 || @ Diamondbacks || 2–3 || Enright (2–2) || Dickey (6–4) || Gutiérrez (3) || 18,749 || 49–45 || Box
|- style="background-color:#fbb"
| 95 || July 21 || @ Diamondbacks || 3–4 || Boyer (2–2) || Nieve (2–4) || — || 18,223 || 49–46 || Box
|- style="background-color:#fbb"
| 96 || July 22 || @ Dodgers || 0–2 || Kuroda (8–8) || Takahashi (7–5) || Kuo (3) || 42,299 || 49–47 || Box
|- style="background-color:#cfc"
| 97 || July 23 || @ Dodgers || 6–1 || Santana (8–5) || Padilla  (4–3) || — || 44,626 || 50–47 || Box
|- style="background-color:#fbb"
| 98 || July 24 || @ Dodgers || 2–3  ||Sherrill (1–1)  ||Pérez (0–4) || — || 43,506 || 50–48 || Box
|- style="background-color:#fbb"
| 99 || July 25 || @ Dodgers || 0–1 || Kershaw (10–5) || Feliciano (2–5) || Jansen (1) || 39,897 || 50–49 || Box
|- style="background-color:#cfc"
| 100 || July 27 || Cardinals || 8–2 || Niese (7–4) || Wainwright (14–6) || — || 37,479 || 51–49 || Box
|- style="background-color:#fbb"
| 101 || July 28 || Cardinals || 7–8  || MacDougal (1–0) || Feliciano (2–6) || Franklin (19) || 35,009 || 51–50 || Box
|- style="background-color:#cfc"
| 102 || July 29 || Cardinals || 4–0 || Dickey (7–4) || Hawksworth (4–7) || Rodríguez (22) || 40,087 || 52–50 || Box
|- style="background-color:#fbb"
| 103 || July 30 || Diamondbacks || 6–9 || Kennedy (6–8) || Valdés (2–3) || Heilman (4) || 34,280 || 52–51 || Box
|- style="background-color:#cfc"
| 104 || July 31 || Diamondbacks || 5–4 || Rodríguez (4–2) || Gutierrez (0–6)  || — || 35,287 || 53–51 || Box

|- style="background-color:#fbb"
| 105 || August 1 || Diamondbacks || 1–14 || Hudson (1–0)|| Niese (7–5) || — || 35,014 || 53–52 || Box
|- style="background-color:#fbb"
| 106 || August 2 || @ Braves || 1–4 || Hudson (12–5) || Santana (8–6) || Wagner (25) || 33,030 || 53–53 || Box
|- style="background-color:#cfc"
| 107 || August 3 || @ Braves || 3–2 || Acosta (2–1) || Wagner (5–2)|| Rodríguez (23)|| 26,578 || 54–53 || Box
|- style="background-color:#fbb"
| 108 || August 4 || @ Braves || 3–8 || Dunn (1–0) || Pelfrey (10–6) || — || 28,536 || 54–54 || Box
|- style="background-color:#fbb"
| 109 || August 6 || @ Phillies || 5–7 || Durbin (3–1) || Parnell (0–1) || Lidge (13) || 45,378 || 54–55 || Box
|- style="background-color:#cfc"
| 110 || August 7 || @ Phillies || 1–0 || Santana (9–6) || Hamels (7–8) || Rodríguez (24) || 45,194 || 55–55 || Box
|- style="background-color:#fbb"
| 111 || August 8 || @ Phillies || 5–6 || Halladay (14–8) || Dickey (7–5) || Lidge (14) || 45,402 || 55–56 || Box
|- style="background-color:#cfc"
| 112 || August 10 || Rockies || 1–0 || Pelfrey (11–6) || Jiménez (17–3) || Rodríguez (25) || 30,036 || 56–56 || Box
|- style="background-color:#fbb"
| 113 || August 11 || Rockies || 2–6 || Belisle (5–4) || Takahashi (7–6) || — || 30,554 || 56–57 || Box
|- style="background-color:#cfc"
| 114 || August 12 || Rockies || 4–0 || Santana (10–6) || Hammel (8–7) || — ||  32,272 || 57–57 || Box
|- style="background-color:#cfc"
| 115 || August 13 || Phillies || 1–0 || Dickey (8–5) || Hamels (7–9) || — || 35,440 || 58–57 || Box
|- style="background-color:#fbb"
| 116 || August 14 || Phillies || 0–4 || Halladay (15–8) || Misch (0–1)|| — || 39,151 || 58–58 || Box
|- style="background-color:#fbb"
| 117 || August 15 || Phillies || 1–3 || Kendrick (8–5) || Pelfrey (11–7) || Lidge (16)|| 31,345 || 58–59 || Box
|- style="background-color:#cfc"
| 118 || August 16 || @ Astros || 3–1 || Feliciano (3–6) || Lindstrom (2–4) || Takahashi (1) || 22,688 || 59–59 || Box
|- style="background-color:#fbb"
| 119 || August 17 || @ Astros || 3–4 || Melancon (1–0) || Santana (10–7) || López (1) || 26,279 || 59–60 || Box
|- style="background-color:#cfc"
| 120 || August 18 || @ Astros || 3–2 || Dessens (3–1) || Chacín (1–2) || Acosta (1) || 23,403 || 60–60 || Box
|- style="background-color:#fbb"
| 121 || August 19 || @ Astros || 2–3  || Norris (6–7) || Misch (0–2) || Lyon (5) || 26,271 || 60–61 || Box
|- style="background-color:#cfc"
| 122 || August 20 || @ Pirates || 7–2 || Pelfrey (12–7) || Karstens (2–10) || — || 23,695 || 61–61 || Box
|- style="background-color:#cfc"
| 123 || August 21 || @ Pirates || 5–1 || Niese (8–5) || McDonald (2–3) || — || 28,759 || 62–61 || Box
|- style="background-color:#fbb"
| 124 || August 22 || @ Pirates || 1–2 || Duke (6–12) || Santana (10–8) || Hanrahan (2) || 24,730 || 62–62 ||Box
|- style="background-color:#cfc"
| 125 || August 24 || Marlins || 6–5 || Takahashi (8–6) || Ohman (0–2) || — || 27,136 || 63–62 || Box
|- style="background-color:#fbb"
| 126 || August 25 || Marlins || 4–5||Sanabia (3-1) || Misch (0-3) ||Núñez (29) ||27,096|| 63–63|| Box
|- style="background-color:#fbb"
| 127 || August 26 || Marlins || 4–11 ||Sánchez (11-8) || Niese (8–6) || — || 28,640||63–64 || Box
|- style="background-color:#cfc"
| 128 || August 27 || Astros ||2–1 ||Pelfrey (13–7) ||Figueroa (3-2) || Takahashi (2)|| 30,178 ||64–64  || Box
|- style="background-color:#fbb"
| 129 || August 28 || Astros || 1–4 || Myers (10–7) || Santana (10–9) || Lyon (9) || 33,024 || 64–65 ||  Box
|- style="background-color:#cfc"
| 130 || August 29 || Astros || 5–1 || Dickey (8–5) || Norris (6–8) || — || 32,779 || 65–65 || Box
|- style="background-color:#fbb"
| 131 || August 30 || @ Braves || 3–9 || Jurrjens (6–4) || Misch (0–4) || O'Flaherty (9) || 18,842 || 65–66 ||Box
|- style="background-color:#fbb"
| 132 || August 31 || @ Braves || 2–9 || Minor (3–0) || Niese (8–7) || — || 18,430 || 65–67 || Box

|- style="background-color:#fbb"
| 133 || September 1 || @ Braves || 1–4 || Hanson (9–10) || Pelfrey (13–8) || Wagner (31) || 19,938 || 66–68 || Box
|- style="background-color:#cfc"
| 134 || September 2 || @ Braves || 4–2 || Santana (11–9) || Hudson (15–6) || Takahashi (3) || 24,895 || 66–68 || Box
|- style="background-color:#fbb"
| 135 || September 3 || @ Cubs || 6–7 || Russell (1–1) || Dickey (9–6) || Mármol (26) || 31,424 || 66–69 || Box
|- style="background-color:#fbb"
| 136 || September 4 || @ Cubs || 3–5 || Zambrano (6–5) || Mejía (0–3) ||  Mármol (27) || 39,473 || 66–70 || Box
|- style="background-color:#cfc"
| 137 || September 5 || @ Cubs || 18–5 || Niese (9–7) || Dempster (12–10) || — || 40,788 || 67–70 || Box
|- style="background-color:#fbb"
| 138 || September 6 || @ Nationals || 3–13 || Olsen (4–8)|| Pelfrey (13–9)|| — || 20,224 || 67–71|| Box
|- style="background-color:#cfc"
| 139 || September 7 || @ Nationals || 4–1 || Gee (1–0) || Maya (0–1) || Takahashi (4) || 13,835 || 68–71 || Box
|- style="background-color:#cfc"
| 140 || September 8 || @ Nationals || 3–2 || Dickey (10–6) || Hernández (9–11)|| Takahashi (5) || 16,002 || 69–71 || Box
|- style="background-color:#fbb"
| 141 || September 10 || Phillies || 4–8 || Halladay (18–10) || Mejía (0–4)  || — || 33,071 || 69–72 || Box
|- style="background-color:#cfc"
| 142 || September 11 || Phillies || 4–3 || Pelfrey (14–9) || Kendrick (9–9) || Takahashi (6) || 35,788 || 70–72 || Box
|- style="background-color:#fbb"
| 143 || September 12 || Phillies || 0–3 || Oswalt (12–13) || Niese (9–8) || — || 31,563 || 70–73 || Box
|- style="background-color:#cfc"
| 144 || September 13 || Pirates || 1–0 (10) || Takahashi (9–6) || Park (3–3) || — || 24,384 || 71–73 || Box
|- style="background-color:#cfc"
| 145 || September 14 || Pirates || 9–1 || Dickey (11–6) || Duke (7–14) || — || 27,438 || 72–73 || Box
|- style="background-color:#cfc"
| 146 || September 15 || Pirates || 8–7 || Valdés (3–3) || Maholm (7–15) || Takahashi (7) || 29,000 || 73–73 || Box
|- style="background-color:#cfc"
| 147 || September 16 ||  Pirates || 6–2 || Pelfrey (15–9) || Ledezma (0–3) || — || 28,790 || 74–73 || Box
|- style="background-color:#fbb"
| 148 || September 17 ||  Braves || 4–6 || Hanson (10–11) || Niese (9–9) || Wagner (34) || 28,002 || 74–74 || Box
|- style="background-color:#fbb"
| 149 || September 18 || Braves || 2–4 || Hudson (16–8) || Gee (1–1) || Wagner (35) || 33,051 || 74–75 || Box
|- style="background-color:#fbb"
| 150 || September 19 || Braves || 3–6 || Lowe (14–12) || Dickey (11–7) || Kimbrel (1) || 33,612 || 74–76 || Box
|- style="background-color:#fbb"
| 151 || September 21 || @ Marlins || 2–5 || Veras (3–2) || Dessens (3–2) || Hensley (4) || 19,422 || 74–77 || Box
|- style="background-color:#fbb"
| 152 || September 22 || @ Marlins || 5–7 || Sanabia (5–3)  || Niese (9–10) || Hensley (5) || 21,123 || 74–78 || Box
|- style="background-color:#fbb"
| 153 || September 24 || @ Phillies || 2–3 || Blanton (8–6)  || Dickey (11–8) || Lidge (27) || 45,309 || 74–79 || Box
|- style="background-color:#cfc"
| 154 || September 25 || @ Phillies || 5–2 || Gee (2–1)|| Kendrick (10–10) || Takahashi (8) || 45,274 || 75–79 || Box
|- style="background-color:#cfc"
| 155 || September 26 || @ Phillies || 7–3 || Acosta (3–1) || Hamels (12–11) || — || 45,302 || 76–79 || Box
|- style="background-color:#bbb"
| — || September 27 || Brewers || colspan=7 | Game Postponed
|- style="background-color:#cfc"
| 156 || September 28 || Brewers || 4–3 || Dessens (4–2)|| Axford (8–2) || — || 24,666 || 77–79 || Box
|- style="background-color:#fbb"
| 157 || September 29 || Brewers || 7–8 || Villanueva (2–0)|| Acosta (3–2) || Axford (23) || — || 77–80 || Box
|- style="background-color:#fbb"
| 158 || September 29 || Brewers || 1–3 || Bush (8–13) || Dickey (11–9) || Hoffman (10) || 28,280 || 77–81 || Box
|- style="background-color:#fbb"
| 159 || September 30 || Brewers || 2–9 || Narveson (12–9) || Gee (2–2) || — || 24,661 || 77–82 || Box
|- style="background-color:#cfc"
| 160 || October 1 ||  Nationals || 2–1  || Takahashi (10–6) || Clippard (11–7) || — || 29,424 || 78–82 || Box
|- style="background-color:#cfc"
| 161 || October 2 ||  Nationals || 7–2 || Igarashi (1–1) || Clippard (11–8) || — || 30,386 || 79–82 || Box
|- style="background-color:#fbb"
| 162 || October 3 ||  Nationals || 1–2 || Peralta (1–0) || Pérez (0–5) || Batista (2) || 30,849 || 79–83 || Box

|-
| colspan=9 | Legend:       = Win       = Loss       = PostponementBold = Mets team member

Season standings

Record vs. opponents

Roster

Player stats

Batting
Note: G = Games played; AB = At bats; R = Runs scored; H = Hits; 2B = Doubles; 3B = Triples; HR = Home runs; RBI = Runs batted in; SB = Stolen bases; BB = Base on balls; K = Strikeouts; AVG = Batting average

Pitching
Note: G = Games pitched; GS = Games started; W = Wins; L = Losses; SV = Saves; IP = Innings pitched; H = Hits allowed; R = Runs allowed; ER = Earned runs allowed; BB = Walks allowed;  K = Strikeouts; ERA = Earned run average;

Farm system

References

External links

2010 New York Mets season Official Site
2010 New York Mets season at Baseball Reference
2010 New York Mets season at ESPN

New York Mets seasons
New York Mets season
New York Mets
2010s in Queens
Flushing, Queens